Bharat Pokhari is a town  in Kaski District in the Gandaki Province of northern-central Nepal. It lies at the height of 657 to 1600 meters above sea level. At the time of the 1991 Nepal census it had a population of 8,889 persons living in 1782 individual households. Bharat Pokhari was a Village Development Committee, and it is merged with Lekhnath Municipality.

The elevation of Bharat Pokhari ranges from 657m to 1600m.

References

External links
UN map of the municipalities of Kaski District

Populated places in Kaski District